Nicolas Rothwell is a journalist and the Northern Australia correspondent for The Australian newspaper. He is also an award-winning writer with two novels and several works of non-fiction to his name.

Background

Rothwell is the child of Czech and Australian parents. His father Bruce Rothwell was a prominent journalist, and the family resided in Australia, Washington DC, and New York among other places. Rothwell attended boarding school in Switzerland and France, and graduated from the University of Oxford. In the 1980s and early 1990s he was a foreign correspondent for The Australian           
and reported from the Americas, the Pacific and Western and Eastern Europe, latterly during the Yugoslav conflict. Burned out by the latter upheaval, in the 1990s he sought out a posting in Australia, again for The Australian newspaper. , he was based in Far North Queensland. His partner is indigenous activist and politician Alison Anderson.

Journalism

The majority of Rothwell's articles can be found in The Australian newspaper. Some of the best are collected in his book Another Country (2007). He won a Walkley Award in 2006 for his journalistic coverage of Indigenous Affairs.

Rothwell has been critical of extensive welfare payments to Indigenous Australians.

Books

Aside from the novels Heaven and Earth (2009) and Red Heaven (2022), Rothwell's books are listed as non-fiction, but always highly personalized and offering romantic accounts of northern Australia. He combines copious literary references with personal observations. 

Wings of the Kite-Hawk (2003) was widely praised for its accounts of the eccentric people and timeless landscapes of the region, as he followed the footsteps of explorers Leichhardt, Sturt, Giles and Strehlow. Another Country (2007) is a compilation of Rothwell's journalism, consisting of shorter accounts of meeting "mystics and artists, explorers and healers". It was deemed to have been finely written but sometimes detached in style. Journeys to the Interior is about "death, friendship, travel and art". 

In The Red Highway, Rothwell evokes his own path, when he says "people who come to northern Australia come here because they’re lost, or searching, or on the edge of life, and silence, and they're chasing after some kind of pattern, some redemption they think might be lurking, on the line of the horizon, out in the faint, receding perspectives of the bush". The Red Highway is a  "sandy, dusty realm", a landscape which has an "interwoven, interconnected quality: a musical aspect – a repetition, and variation: the way the light filtering through the stringy-barks echoes, and speaks to the changes in the landforms; the way shape and pattern are multiplied at different levels, so that the branching arms of a river delta seem like the veins of a leaf ...".

Books 
Rothwell, N. 1999. Heaven and Earth. Duffy & Snellgrove Publishers.
Rothwell, N. 2003. Wings of the Kite Hawk. Sydney: Picador. Reprinted Black Inc. 2009
Rothwell, N. 2007. Another Country. Melbourne: Black Inc.
Rothwell, N. 2009. The Red Highway. Melbourne: Black Inc.
Rothwell, N. 2010. Journeys to the Interior. Melbourne: Black Inc.
Rothwell, N. 2013. Belomor. Melbourne: Text Publishing.
Rothwell, N. 2016. Quicksilver. Melbourne: Text Publishing.
Rothwell, N. 2021. Red Heaven. Melbourne: Text Publishing.

Articles 
 Rothwell, N. 2008. Travels in the Northern realm: the idea of the North.
 Rothwell, N. 2008. Indigenous insiders chart an end to victimhood. (refers to Marcia Langton and Noel Pearson. The Australian Literary Review, Sept 2008
 Rothwell, N. 2009. Our Fourth World.
 Rothwell, N. 2009. Into the Red: Haydn in the Outback

Video 
Marcia Langton and Nicolas Rothwell on The Red Highway 2009 http://www.blackincbooks.com/blackitv/red-highway-nicolas-rothwell

Audio 
 "The Landscape Behind the Landscape" – 2014 Eric Rolls Memorial Lecture

Awards and recognition 

 Winner, Prime Minister's Literary Award for fiction 2022 for Red Heaven

References

Living people
Year of birth missing (living people)
Australian journalists
The Australian journalists
Alumni of the University of Oxford
Australian people of Czech descent